Oblivion Clock is an EP by the Norwegian avant-garde metal band Virus. It was released on 1 December 2012 by Duplicate Records.

Background
The working title of Oblivion Clock was Flux the Fluent. It was recorded at various locations in a period of eleven years; the work on the EP began as far as 2001 and it was finished by the end of 2012.

This was the band's last album with the session bassist and keyboardist Bjeima. Additional session bassists on the album were Plenum, who at the time was an ex-member of Virus, and Bård Ingebrigtsen. Cover art for EP was made by the band's drummer Einar Sjursø.

Track listing

Personnel

Virus
Einz — drums, cover art, production
Czral — vocals, guitars, production
Other staff
 Zweizz — lyrics (track 5)

Additional personnel
 Plenum — bass guitar (tracks 1, 5)
 Bård — bass guitar (track 7)
 Bjeima — bass guitar (tracks 2, 3, 6), keyboards, samples, production

References

2012 EPs
Virus (Norwegian band) EPs